Mera (alternative spelling Mara) or Daullah is a type of rice dumpling which is very popular in Bangladesh especially in Sylhet and Mymensingh and neighbouring districts. It is made of rice flour, salt, molasses, coconut etc. In some areas it is also called the Gota Pitha or Bhapa Channai.

Ingredients 

 Ground rice flour
 Molasses and/or salt
 Coconuts

References 

Bangladeshi desserts
Steamed foods
Bengali cuisine
Bangladeshi cuisine
Pitha